is a Japanese artistic gymnast. Born in Osaka, Japan, he graduated from Nippon Sport Science University & later joined Tokushukai Gymnastics Club. Haruki was part of Japan men's national gymnastics team that won the silver medal at the 2019 Asian Artistic Gymnastics Championships.

Competitive history

Detailed Results

2017-2020 Code of Points

See also 
 Japan men's national gymnastics team

References

External links 
 Minori Haruki at FIG Official
 Minori Haruki

Japanese male artistic gymnasts
Sportspeople from Osaka Prefecture
Living people
1999 births
21st-century Japanese people